Barbarea vulgaris, also called wintercress (usual common name), or alternatively herb barbara, rocketcress, yellow rocketcress, winter rocket, yellow rocket, and wound rocket, is a biennial herb of the genus Barbarea, belonging to the family Brassicaceae.

Description

The stem is ribbed and hairless, branched at the base. It has basal rosettes of shiny, dark green leaves. The basal leaves are stalked and lyre-pinnatifid, that is with a large terminal lobe and smaller lower lobes. The cauline leaves are smaller, ovate, toothed, or lobed. The flowers are borne  in spring in dense terminal clusters above the foliage. The flowering period extends from about April through July.

Chemical substances in this species include saponins, flavonoids, and glucosinolates.

Taxonomy
Formally, B. vulgaris was first published and described by William Aiton in his 'Hortus Kewensis' Vol.4 on page 109 in 1812. Some references still mention Robert Brown (Robert Brown (botanist, born 1773)), as the author. Indeed, botanists believe that R. Brown was the actual author of the first botanical description of B. vulgaris in the description of the family Brassicaceae (in Hortus Kew. ed. 2). However, W. T. Aiton, the publishing author, did not mention or indicate R. Brown's name for Brassicaceae; therefore, W. T. Aiton is author of the Brassicaceae novelties in this work. 

B. vulgaris has various common names of which the most commonly used is 'wintercress' (e.g. Gleason, H.A. Illustrated Flora of the NE United States and Adjacent Canada, 1952), which can also be used for the entire genus Barbarea. Many other common names are listed in various sources, including (in alphabetical order), 'cressy-greens', 'English wintercress', 'herb-Barbaras', 'rocket cress', and 'yellow rocket'. Two additional names sometimes used, 'bittercress' and 'upland cress' are ambiguous; the name 'bittercress' usually signifies various species of the genus Cardamine, and 'upland cress' usually signifies Barbarea verna.

Etymology
The genus name Barbarea derives from Saint Barbara, the patron saint of artillerymen and miners, as this plant in the past was used to soothe the wounds caused by explosions. The species Latin name vulgaris means “common”.

Natural insect resistance and its potential use in agriculture
Most B. vulgaris genotypes are naturally resistant to some insect species that are otherwise specialized on the crucifer family. In the case of diamondback moth (Plutella xylostella) and the flea beetle Phyllotreta nemorum, the resistance is caused by saponins. Glucosinolates such as glucobarbarin and glucobrassicin are used as a cue for egg-laying by female cabbage white butterflies such as Pieris rapae. Indeed, the larvae of this butterfly thrive well on this plant. Diamondback moth females are also stimulated by these chemicals, but the larvae die due to the content of saponins which are apparently not sensed by the moths. This phenomenon has been tested for biological insect control: B. vulgaris plants are placed in a field and attract much of the diamondback moth egg load. As the larvae die shortly after hatching, this kind of insect control has been named "dead-end trap cropping".

Distribution
Native to Eurasia and North Africa, it is naturalised in many parts of North America and New Zealand as a weed.

Range
It is found in temperate North Africa within Algeria and Tunisia. Also in Asia, within Afghanistan, Armenia, Azerbaijan, the Caucasus, China (in the provinces of Heilongjiang, Jiangsu, Jilin and Xinjiang), Georgia, Iran, Iraq, Japan (in the provinces Hokkaido, Honshu, Kyushu, Ryukyu Islands and Shikoku), Kazakhstan, Kyrgyzstan, Mongolia, Siberia, Tajikistan, Turkmenistan and Turkey. It is also found in tropical parts Asia, such as India (-
in the provinces of Sikkim, Himachal Pradesh, Jammu and Kashmir, Tamil Nadu, Uttar Pradesh and Arunachal Pradesh), Pakistan and Sri Lanka.

In eastern Europe, it is found within Belarus, Estonia, Latvia, Lithuania, Moldova and Ukraine. In middle Europe, it is in Austria, Belgium, the Czech Republic, Germany, Hungary, the Netherlands, Poland, Slovakia and Switzerland. In northern Europe, in Denmark, Ireland, Sweden and United Kingdom. In southeastern Europe, within Albania, Bosnia and Herzegovina, Bulgaria, Croatia, Greece, Italy, Montenegro, North Macedonia, Romania, Serbia and Slovenia. Lastly, it is found in southwestern Europe, it is found in France, Portugal and Spain.

Habitat

It also prefers to grow in siliceous, calcareous, sandy, alluvial and clay soils.

Natural chemotypes with distinct ecology
A pubescent type (the "P-type") has been described from southern Scandinavia and Russia. While this chemotype is rare in Scandinavia, it seems to be dominant in Russia according to the only survey made so far. This type has atypical chemistry and is devoid of resistance to the diamondback moth and the flea beetle Phyllotreta nemorum. The P-type belongs morphologically to the variety B. vulgaris var. arcuata, but may also be identical to the variety originally described as Barbarea arcuata Rchb. var. pubescens N. Busch. In this context, the usual type of B. vulgaris var. arcuata is called the "G-type" (for glabrous (hairless) leaves). This type is reported to be dominant in Central Europe. On a genomic scale, more than 22.000 genes (89% of those tested) were found to have fixed differences between the two types.

A chemotype with deviating glucosinolate content has been described from Western and Central Europe and named the "NAS-type" (because it is dominated by the glucosinolate glucoNASturtiin. This type has increased resistance to some specialized insects. In this context, the usual chemotype of B. vulgaris is called the "BAR" type (because it is dominated by glucoBARbarin).

While the P-type and G-type differ in multiple genetic, chemical and morphological features, the NAS and BAR types seem to be a simple monogenic variation. For this reason, it has been suggested to refer to NAS and BAR forms (from the lowest botanical rank forma) and P- and G-types. Indeed, occasional NAS form plants in Central Europe were found to be G-type by a set of genetic markers.

Uses
The young leaves can be eaten raw or cooked. The buds and flowers are also edible. It can also be used as a dead-end trap crop for diamondback moth, the caterpillar of which is a pest on cruciferous plants like Cabbage.

Subspecies
 Barbarea vulgaris var. arcuata (Opiz ex J. Presl & C. Presl) Fr.
 Barbarea vulgaris var. brachycarpa Rouy & Foucaud
 Barbarea vulgaris var. longisiliquosa Carion
 Barbarea vulgaris var. sylvestris Fr.

Gallery

See also

 Barbarea verna

References

External links

 United States Department of Agriculture plants Profile for Barbarea vulgaris (garden yellowrocket)
 

vulgaris
Flora of North Africa
Flora of Europe
Flora of temperate Asia
Flora of the Indian subcontinent
Leaf vegetables
Medicinal plants of Asia
Medicinal plants of Europe
Least concern plants
Plants described in 1812